Valērijs Šabala (born 12 October 1994) is a Latvian footballer, who plays for B36 Tórshavn of the Faroe Islands Premier League.

Club career

Early career 
As a youth player Šabala was a member of Daugava Rīga academy. With the club winning the 2008 Latvian First League and being promoted to the Latvian Higher League for the 2009 season, Šabala was one of the youngsters to be included in the first team squad by the manager Vladimirs Beļajevs. Šabala made his debut on 15 October 2009, having just turned 15, when he came on as a substitute in the 46th minute in an 8–0 loss against the defending champions FK Ventspils. Three days later he appeared in the match against FC Tranzit, coming on as a substitute in the 88th minute. Daugava Rīga were relegated to the Latvian First League and Šabala joined the Latvian Higher League newcomers JFK Olimps in January 2010. Šabala scored his first Latvian Higher League goal on 23 April 2010 in a match against Skonto Riga. At the time he was 15 years and 193 days old, which made him the youngest ever goalscorer in the history of Latvian championship and all the top tier European football leagues. His record was broken on 10 June 2014, when Skonto Riga midfielder Jānis Grīnbergs scored a penalty against Daugava Daugavpils being just 15 years and 102 days old. All in all that season Šabala played 21 league matches and scored 6 goals.

Skonto Riga 
In February 2011 Šabala joined that time Latvian Higher League champions Skonto Riga. In his debut season with the club he was rarely used in the first eleven and often came on as a substitute, scoring 2 goals in 22 matches. Šabala scored his first league goal for Skonto on 25 September 2011 against his former club JFK Olimps. Despite the limited playing time, he was named Young player of the year and received the Ilmārs Liepiņš prize. Throughout the season Šabala went on short term trials with Arsenal, Watford and Udinese Calcio.

In January 2012 Šabala went on trial with the Ukrainian Premier League club Dynamo Kyiv alongside his international teammate Vitālijs Jagodinskis, but eventually returned to Skonto with only the latter one signing a contract. On 30 June 2012 Šabala scored his first hat-trick in a league match against FS Metta/LU being just 17 years 8 months and 18 days old. On 10 July he was named the best Latvian Higher League player in June. In September Šabala went on trial with the Russian Premier League club CSKA Moscow and played in their friendly match against Lokomotiv-2 Moscow. In November information appeared in the media that CSKA Moscow were ready to offer Skonto 3.5 million euros for the player, but eventually the move did not occur. Šabala finished the 2012 season as the 5th top scorer of the league with 11 goals. In December he received the Ilmārs Liepiņš prize as the Young player of the year for the second season in a row.

In the 2013 season Šabala scored 15 league goals, coming one goal short to his teammate Artūrs Karašausks and Daugava Daugavpils player Andrejs Kovaļovs, who both became the top scorers of the league with 16 goals each. On 18 July Šabala helped Skonto beat the Czech club Slovan Liberec 2–1 at home in the UEFA Europa League 2nd round qualification match, scoring the first goal. He was included in the LFF and sportacentrs.com Latvian Higher League Team of the Tournament and named the best forward of the season. Skonto confirmed having received concrete offers for the player from the Turkish Süper Lig club Trabzonspor, Italian Serie A club Hellas Verona and Belgian Pro League club Club Brugge.

Club Brugge 
On 29 January 2014 Šabala joined the Belgian Pro League club Club Brugge, signing a contract till 30 June 2018. In order to get immediate playing time he was loaned back to Skonto till 1 July 2014. During the loan spell Šabala appeared in 9 league matches and scored 5 goals. Having spent the pre-season preparation period with Club Brugge, Šabala was given out on another loan to the Cypriot First Division club Anorthosis Famagusta on 22 August 2014.

Podbeskidzie Bielsko-Biała 

After loan stints in Poland, the Czech Republic, Slovakia and Latvia, on August 4, 2017 Šabala signed a two-year contract with I liga side Podbeskidzie Bielsko-Biała. He became the top scorer of the 2018–19 I liga season, scoring 12 goals.

International career 
Šabala was a member of all international youth teams and made his debut for the Latvia national football team on 24 May 2013 in a friendly match against Qatar. In the next match he scored his first goals for the national team, scoring twice in a friendly against Turkey, becoming the youngest ever international goal scorer for Latvia. His first official qualifier match was the 2014 World Cup qualifying match against Bosnia and Herzegovina.

International goals
Scores and results list Latvia's goal tally first.

Career statistics

Club

Honours

Club
Skonto FC
 Latvian Cup (1): 2011–2012
 Baltic League (1): 2010–11

International
 Baltic Cup (1): 2014

Individual
 Latvian Higher League young player of the year (2): 2011, 2012
 Latvian Higher League best forward (1): 2013
 Polish I liga top-scorer (1): 2018–19

Notes

References

Příbram sprawdza Valērijsa Šabalę‚ Příbram sprawdza Valērijsa Šabalę, 20 January 2016

External links
 
 
 

1994 births
Living people
Latvian people of Russian descent
Footballers from Riga
Latvian footballers
Association football forwards
Latvia international footballers
Cypriot First Division players
JFK Olimps players
Skonto FC players
Club Brugge KV players
Anorthosis Famagusta F.C. players
Miedź Legnica players
FC DAC 1904 Dunajská Streda players
Slovak Super Liga players
FK RFS players
Podbeskidzie Bielsko-Biała players
FK Sūduva Marijampolė players
GKS Bełchatów players
FK Liepāja players
KÍ Klaksvík players
Liga I players
FC Viitorul Constanța players
Latvian expatriate footballers
Expatriate footballers in Belgium
Expatriate footballers in Cyprus
Expatriate footballers in the Czech Republic
Expatriate footballers in Poland
Expatriate footballers in Slovakia
Expatriate footballers in Lithuania
Expatriate footballers in Romania
Expatriate footballers in the Faroe Islands
Latvian expatriate sportspeople in Belgium
Latvian expatriate sportspeople in Cyprus
Latvian expatriate sportspeople in the Czech Republic
Latvian expatriate sportspeople in Poland
Latvian expatriate sportspeople in Slovakia
Latvian expatriate sportspeople in Lithuania
Latvian expatriate sportspeople in Romania